Can't Stop Eating is an EP by indie rock band Starflyer 59, released in 2002 on Tooth & Nail Records.

Track listing
(all songs written by Jason Martin except where noted)
"Compeating" – 3:07
"West Coast Friendship" – 3:55
"Happy Birthday John" (Damien Jurado) – 3:13
"Give Up the War" (Stereo Mix) – 4:50
"Theme from Dromedary" – 3:05

Credits
Jason Martin – guitar, singing
Jeff Cloud – bass guitar
Joey Esquibel – drum kit
Richard Swift – keys
Andy Prickett – slide guitar on "Happy Birthday John"

2002 EPs
Starflyer 59 EPs
Tooth & Nail Records EPs